Lee Jong-beom (born March 2, 1982) is a South Korean webtoon artist. He is best known for writing the webtoon Dr. Frost. He has also appeared in The Genius: Black Garnet in 2014.

References

External links
 

1982 births
Living people
South Korean manhwa artists
South Korean webtoon creators
Yonsei University alumni